Episode 7 may refer to:

 Star Wars: The Force Awakens also known as Star Wars: Episode VII – The Force Awakens, a 2015 film
 Episode 7 (Humans series 1), 2015 episode
 "Episode 7" (Twin Peaks), 1990 episode
 "Episode 7" (Tá no Ar), 2014 episode

See also
 The Seven, 1996 episode of Seinfeld
 Episode (disambiguation)
 7 (disambiguation)